"For He Can Creep" is a 2019 historical fantasy short story by Siobhan Carroll, about the historical figure Christopher Smart and his cat, Jeoffry.

Synopsis
While Christopher Smart is confined for insanity in St. Luke's Asylum, he is repeatedly visited by Satan, who wants him to write a poem that will end the world — and only his cat Jeoffry (with the help of several other cats) can stop him.

Reception
For He Can Creep won the 2020 Eugie Award
and was a finalist for the 2019 Nebula Award for Best Novelette, the 2020 Hugo Award for Best Novelette. and the 2020 World Fantasy Award for Best Short Fiction.

Lela E. Buis considered it "highly entertaining" and "way too short". In Locus, Karen Burnham praised the portrayal of Jeoffrey as "both charming and intense", emphasizing the "ultimate cat attitude poured into every line".

References

Christopher Smart
Works originally published in online magazines
Fantasy short stories
2019 short stories